Film4 is a British free-to-air television network owned by Channel Four Television Corporation launched on 1 November 1998, devoted to broadcasting films. While its standard-definition channel is available on Freeview and Freesat platforms, its high-definition variant is offered only as a pay television service.

The channel offered an online video on demand service, Film4oD until it was closed in July 2015.

History
The network has its origins in Channel Four Films, a production company opened by Channel Four Television Corporation in 1982 which has been responsible for backing a large number of films made in the United Kingdom and around the world. The company's first production was Stephen Frears' Walter, which was released in the same year.

On 1 November 1998, the production company was re-branded as FilmFour to coincide with the launch of a new digital television channel of the same name on both Sky and ONdigital platforms, becoming Channel 4's second network. At its launch, it was a subscription-only service costing £6 a month, eventually rising to £7. The launch night (which was also broadcast on Channel 4) was hosted by Johnny Vaughan and the first film to be shown was 1995's The Usual Suspects. On 31 March 2000 at 6.00am, the analogue version of FilmFour shut down and later switched to digital.

On 7 April 2001, the three additional channels were added: FilmFour World broadcasts international cinema from 4.00pm to 10.00pm, as well as FilmFour Extreme carries "controversial and cutting-edge" movies from 10.00pm to 4.00am which operated on a timeshare, and the timeshift channel FilmFour +1.

In July 2002, Channel 4 reduced FilmFour's budget from £30 to £10 million and cut 50 staff to curb mounting losses, reintegrating FilmFour as a division of its television operation to continue to invest in new films. The cuts were a consequence of FilmFour's unsuccessful attempts to compete with Hollywood. David Thompson, head of BBC Films described it as:

Also in the same year, Tessa Ross became the head of both FilmFour and Channel 4 drama. FilmFour World and Extreme were discontinued on 5 May 2003 and replaced by FilmFour Weekly, which screened four movies across the week at the same time each day to make it easier to catch at least once.

Subscription access to FilmFour ended on 19 July 2006, as well as FilmFour Weekly ceased broadcasting to become a free channel, and the service relaunched under modified branding as Film4 a few days later on 23 July. With this relaunch, the channel also returned to digital terrestrial television as part of the Freeview service. At this time, it also became free-to-air on satellite television. As part of the rebrand, the production company was also rebranded to "Film4 Productions". Due to the change, the channel's availability increased from 300,000 (subscribers) to 18 million households. It also changed its broadcasting hours, broadcasting from 12.45pm to 8.45am with commercial breaks included during films for the first time. The first film broadcast under the new format was the British non-subscription television premiere of 2003's Lost in Translation. Prior to the arrivals of Movie Mix and Movies4Men on the Freeview platform, Film4 was the only free film channel available on digital terrestrial television.

From 23 May 2009, the broadcasting hours were amended to 11.00am to 4.00am, with the downtime hours broadcasting either teleshopping or an animated caption screen stating when the channel will return. On 1 November 2010, Film4 partnered with FilmFlex to launch Film4oD.

On 2 September 2014, Film4 debuted a new on-air look, designed by Man vs. Machine. There are 15 new idents in the series which run alongside a new on-screen presentation.

Former logos

Subsidiary channels

Film4 +1
Prior to 20 August 2007, Film4 operated a one-hour timeshift channel, Film4 +1, on satellite, cable and Freeview. This channel was later dropped on Freeview to free up space for Channel 4 +1, but returned on 27 August 2013. It continued to be broadcast on Sky, Virgin and Freesat during this time period. On 26 November 2014, Film4 +1 became available via Freeview HD services only.

On 10 January 2019, Film4 +1 was moved from the Freeview HD PSB3 (DVB-T2) multiplex to the Freeview PSB2 (DVB-T) multiplex, making the service available once again to viewers with non-HD Freeview systems and television sets that are incapable of decoding DVB-T2 signals. The capacity on PSB2 was made available by the "Sewing Quarter" service moving to Freeview COM6 (DVB-T) multiplex operated by Arqiva.

Film4 HD
On 20 July 2010, Film4 HD launched exclusively on Virgin Media's cable television platform on channel 429, only available on certain packages. Film4 HD launched on Sky on 2 September 2013, but requires customers to add the Sky HD upgrade to their subscription. Film4 HD is not available on Freeview.

See also
 List of television channels in the United Kingdom
 50 Films to See Before You Die
 London FrightFest Film Festival
 Carlton Cinema
 Sky Cinema

References

External links
 

Channel 4 television channels
Movie channels in the United Kingdom
Television channels in the United Kingdom
Television channels and stations established in 1998
1998 establishments in the United Kingdom